Dracophyllum ouaiemense is a species of shrub in the family Ericaceae and is endemic to New Caledonia. It was first described by Robert Virot in 1975 and gets the specific epithet ouaiemense after the region in which it grows: Roche Ouaième. It inhabits the tops of mountains and more gentle slopes and reaches a height of 50 cm.

References

Notes

Citations 

ouaiemense
Endemic flora of New Caledonia
Taxa named by Robert Virot